Doctors is a British medical soap opera which began broadcasting on BBC One on 26 March 2000. Set in the fictional West Midlands town of Letherbridge, the soap follows the lives of the staff and patients of the Mill Health Centre, a fictional NHS doctor's surgery, as well as its sister surgery, the University of Letherbridge Campus Surgery. Kirsty Millar (Kiruna Stamell) is hired as a receptionist in January, while Wendi Peters made her debut as Dr. Nina Bulsara in February. In March, Rahul Arya joined the cast as Dr. Suni Bulsara, Nina's son. Additionally, multiple other characters appear throughout the year.

Kirsty Millar

Kirsty Millar, portrayed by Kiruna Stamell, made her first appearance on 11 January 2023. She is introduced as a receptionist at the Mill Health Centre following the dismissal of former receptionist Valerie Pitman (Sarah Moyle). In her first scene, she reconciles with Ruhma Carter (Bharti Patel), who she has known for years due to working with her at St. Phils Hospital. Ruhma has high praise for Kirsty, informing the staff at the Mill how experienced she is. Speaking of her first episode, What's on TV wrote that Kirsty would divide the existing staff due to her "forthright manner". On her BBC profile, Kirsty was described as an "organised, loving, opinionated" character that "doesn’t suffer fools". It also stated that her reason for coming to the Mill was to seek a new life. TVTimes wrote that thirty-something Kirsty would surprise the staff; Bear Sylvester "quickly realises she isn't backwards in coming forwards" when she immediately demands a new reception desk due to her dwarfism, while Emma Reid (Dido Miles) is "thrown" when Kirsty intercepts and takes over between herself and an angry patient.

What's on TV also teased the imminent arrivals of her husband and son, Rich (Richard Atwill) and Ollie (Isaac Benn). Simon Timblick of What to Watch confirmed that Kirsty's home life would be a focal point of her first storyline in the series. She is shown to not want to be with Rich anymore and a week into her time on Doctors, she tells him to pack his belongings and leave. She also has difficulties with Ollie reluctantly joining the army. Inside Soap also hinted that Kirsty and fellow receptionist Scarlett Kiernan (Kia Pegg) would have a workplace dispute when the pair "rub each other up the wrong way".

Stamell appeared on the BBC topical Morning Live in March 2023 to talk about her time on Doctors, where she said that she was grateful to be given a character backstory that did not revolve around being disabled. Presenter Gethin Jones remarked that Kirsty does not reference her dwarfism, which Stamell replied that she is thankful for. She felt that since Kirsty's family and colleagues would be used to her condition, there would be no point in talking about it since it is part of her everyday life. Since Stamell has an Australian-influenced accent from her time living there, Sam Quek asked how she had learned the Brummie dialect. She recalled listening to audiobooks narrated by Jess Phillips and Alison Hammond and said that she was influenced by their accents. Stamell struggled to pick up the accent at first, but began to feel more comfortable using it the longer she had stayed in the role.

Nina Bulsara

Dr. Nina Bulsara, portrayed by Wendi Peters, made her first appearance on 20 February 2023. Peters began filming on Doctors in October 2022 and announced her casting on the BBC topical series Morning Live on 2 November 2022. Peters, who rose to prominence for portraying Cilla Battersby-Brown on Coronation Street, said that Nina is a completely different character. Her backstory involves growing up as the daughter of two solicitors who went on to marry a consultant who died from a stroke. Peters described Nina as a headstrong woman who "knows what she wants" and hoped that she would get it. Helen Daly of the Radio Times described Nina as "a chatterbox who has an opinion on everything and everyone" and opined that while she can be overbearing for her fellow colleagues, she is "a ray of light and will always find the positive in any difficult situation". Daly wrote that Nina would be a good addition to the cast, as well as Metros Calli Kitson being intrigued by the character. Doctors co-star Elisabeth Dermot Walsh posted online that she was excited for viewers to meet the "charming, dynamic and maddening character".

On Peters' casting, executive producer Mike Hobson said: "We are absolutely delighted to welcome Wendi to the Doctors cast. She is a familiar face every soap fan will recognise and we know she will be brilliant in this role. Wendi joins as Dr Nina Bulsara who is a feisty busybody who wants to be respected. She is bound to ruffle a few feathers at the Mill." In November 2022, Peters appeared on the Hear She Is radio show, where she talked about her role prior to her debut appearance airing. She confirmed that Nina's surname is derived from her dead husband, who was Indian. She also revealed that the pair have a son together who arrives in the serial a few weeks after Nina's debut. Prior to being cast as Nina, Peters had portrayed Nicky Connelly in a 2021 episode of Doctors. The radio show host asked her if there was any connection between the two roles, to which she clarified that Nina is a new and unconnected character.

Peters' first episode as Nina was set to air on 8 February 2023 where the character meets with Zara Carmichael (Walsh) at a medical conference. In the episode, the characters get caught up in an explosion at the hotel hosting the conference. However, due to the episode being set for transmission at a similar time to the 2023 Turkey–Syria earthquake, the BBC decided not to pull the episode from schedules hours before transmission. The episode eventually aired on 20 February 2023. The trauma acts as bonding for Nina and Zara and the two become set on introducing Nina as a partner at the Mill Health Centre. Once Zara persuades fellow partner Daniel Granger (Matthew Chambers) to allow Nina to become a partner, she states that she wants her son, Dr. Suni Bulsara (Rahul Arya), to be hired at the Mill.

Suni Bulsara

Dr. Suni Bulsara, portrayed by Rahul Arya, made first appearance on 8 March 2023. He was introduced as the son of Nina (Wendi Peters). Nina becomes a partner at the Mill Health Centre and one of her first acts is getting Suni hired as a doctor there as she feels he would be perfect to work there. Upon his hiring, it was hinted in episode descriptions that he would "ruffle feathers" amongst his new colleagues.

Suni arrives on his first day in a luxury sports car which he parks in the charging port section of the car park. Scarlett Kiernan (Kia Pegg) tells him he cannot park there, but he ignores her since he wants to show off his car in a prominent location. A reluctant Scarlett gives him a tour of the building, but Suni quickly gets bored and wanders into Luca McIntyre's (Ross McLaren) nursing room where he is "favourably impressed by the sight of Luca". Suni is bisexual and after flirting with Luca, he also flirts with Scarlett. However, Luca notices that he clams up when Nina walks in on the pair talking, and eventually learns that Suni is not out to his mother. Metros Chris Hallam noted how Suni makes a bad impression on almost everybody at the Mill and suggested that he may be "too flash and not really cut out to be a doctor".

Other characters

References

Doctors
2023